Lake Spring is an unincorporated community in northwest Dent County, Missouri, United States. It is located approximately twelve miles southeast of Rolla on Route 72.

A post office called Lake Spring has been in operation since 1856. The community was named after a nearby pool of water fed by a spring. The Hyer Woods Conservation Area comprises approximately 30 acres in the Lake Spring community.

References

Unincorporated communities in Dent County, Missouri
Unincorporated communities in Missouri